(Supurauto) is a 2012 Japanese television drama series based on the manga of the same name by Atsuko Nanba. Yuri Chinen, who is a member of Hey! Say! JUMP, played the lead role. It premiered on NTV from July 7 to September 29 every Saturday night.

Cast
 Yuri Chinen as Sōhei Narahashi
 Aoi Morikawa as Miku Ikenouchi
 Fujiko Kojima as Miyuki Ozawa
 Lewis Jesse as Hayato Katagiri
 Ryosuke Hashimoto as Naoharu Takigawa
 Mayuko Kawakita as Kiyoka Taniyama
 You Kikkawa as Haruka Hayase
 Shintaro Yamada as Seiji Okunuki

References

External links
  
 

Japanese drama television series
2012 in Japanese television
2012 Japanese television series debuts
2012 Japanese television series endings
Nippon TV dramas